Budhan is a village in Sub Division Bijhari and Tehsil Barsar, District Hamirpur, Himachal Pradesh, India. The village is in the outer Sivalik Hills at an average elevation of 800 meters. It is located in Hamirpur, situated to the east of Bilaspur District in Himachal Pradesh. district Bilaspur. The village is known as "An Eye to The South."  

Its major tourist attractions fall in the middle of Hamirpur and Bilaspur Districts which include the Dhauladhar Range, Naina Devi Hills, Swarghat and Bahadurpur Hills, which can be easily seen from the hilltop of this village. The Gram Panchayat Bhawan is located on the Bijhri to Barthin road. Budhan has a primary health centre and veterinary centre. Population of 580 people. Registered NGO "Gram Sudhar Sabha" was founded by residents who coordinate with Panchayat Pradhan for the matters related to the development of the area.

Climate
Summers in Budhan can be extremely hot, with average temperatures ranging from 31 °C to 42 °C in June. The rainy season is mid-June to early September. Whereas upper Himachal experiences chilling winters, the weather in the lower region is moderate, with winter temperatures typically falling between 20 °C to -2 °C. Sometimes, the village also experiences mild snowfall, mostly on the hills.

Native plants and animals
Budhan is located at an average elevation of 800 meters above sea level with a wide range of natural pine forest trees spread all over the area. There are some lakes that are home to common fish and other aquatic creatures, as well as other tropical species of reptiles and birds. Towards the end of the twentieth century, the village has witnessed a swift increase in the population of primates such as monkeys and langurs.

Demographics
Budhan consists of a Hindu population of mostly Brahmins 89% and Rajputs 11%. Men make up 53% of the population, women 47%. Children younger than 15 years of age account for 23% of the population. To meet the occupational needs, many people of the village work elsewhere, such as Ludhiana, Chandigarh, New Delhi, Dubai and other locations.

Geography
The area is in the southern edge of Hamirpur District, where on its north are the Himalayas ranges and the lower hills of Bilaspur, Kangra and Mandi Districts. Shukkar-Khud is a small river that flows through the valley formed by Budhan Hills and Vaishno Devi Hills.

Education
The village has a 98% literacy rate. Educational institutes surrounding the region:
 GHS Sanghiya Da Tiala - 800M
 GSSS Bijhari -3 km
 Neelam Public School Birhu -1 km 
 Chaman Memorial ITI Birhu -900M 
 Kids Bud School Bijhar-3.5 km 
 Sunrise Public School-6 km 
 SVMGarli-6 km 
 Govt Degree Collage Chakmoh - 10 km 
 MIT Bani- 16 km 
 Gurukul International School- 18 km 
 National Institute of Technology

References

Villages in Hamirpur district, Himachal Pradesh